Donghutang is a rural town in Ningxiang City, Hunan Province, China. It is surrounded by Yanglin Township and Ruyi Township on the west, Xiaduopu Town and Nantianping Township on the north, Yuchangping Town on the east, and Huaminglou Town on the south.

Administrative division
The Town is divided into seven villages and one community: 
 Donghutang Community
 Taipingqiao
 Quanshan
 Mashan
 Taojiawan
 Yanshan
 Xichongshan
 Quantangwan

Geography
The Wei River and Jin River flow through the town.

Economy
Citrus is important to the economy.

The region abounds with coal, refractory clay and iron.

Culture
Huaguxi is the most influence local theater.

Transportation

Provincial Highway
The Provincial Highway S208 from Yutan Subdistrict, running through Donghutang Town, Huaminglou Town to Shaoshan City.

Expressway
The Changsha-Shaoshan-Loudi Expressway, which runs east through Huaminglou Town and Daolin Town to Yuelu District, Changsha, and the west through Jinshi Town, Huitang Town, Jinsou Township, Yueshan Town, Hutian Town to Louxing District, Loudi.

The Shaoshan Expressway runs through the town.

County Road
The County Road X087 runs southeast to Huaminglou Town.

The County Road X023 runs southwest and intersects with the Provincial Highway S208.

Notable individuals 
, revolutionary.

References

Divisions of Ningxiang
Ningxiang